Mullaney v. Wilbur, 421 U.S. 684 (1975), is a criminal case in which a unanimous court struck down a state statute requiring a defendant to prove the defense of provocation to downgrade a murder conviction to manslaughter. Previous common law, such as in Commonwealth v. York (1845), allowed such burden on the defense. 

Maine's statute defined murder as unlawfully killing with malice, with malice defined as deliberate and unprovoked cruelty, and added that killings were presumed to be unprovoked unless the defense proved provocation by a preponderance of the evidence. Justice Powell delivered the opinion for the court that provocation was a crucial part of the charge in that it determined "the degree of culpability attaching to the criminal homicide". 

States were able to circumvent this decision by careful wording, as in Patterson v. New York, in which provocation, or "extreme emotional disturbance", was classified as an allowable defense excuse, not as a listed element.

See also
 List of United States Supreme Court cases
 Lists of United States Supreme Court cases by volume
 List of United States Supreme Court cases by the Burger Court

References

External links

1975 in United States case law
United States Supreme Court cases
United States Supreme Court cases of the Burger Court